Samur-Yalama National Park is a national park of Azerbaijan. It was established on November 5, 2012, within the territory of Khachmaz Rayon administrative districts.

The park's goal is preservation of the biological and genetic diversity of several unique natural areas, as well as the historical-cultural objects of the region. In addition eco-tourism and recreation is aimed to be developed. Some tourist routes start in Yalama.

Description
The largest portion of the park is in the Caspian coastal zone, which is heavily forested. Several landscapes can be found: littoral landscapes, wooded landscapes, forest-bush landscapes, bushes and arid steppe landscapes. There are four climate zones, with different amounts of rainfall: in the coastal zones less than 350 mm, and in the inland zones more than 450 mm. The soil varies form very sandy to very clayed.

Flora and fauna

Flora

The dominant tree species are chestnut oak and Persian ironwood.

Fauna

Some characteristic species are black kite, eastern imperial eagle, otter, reed cat, lynx, chamois, Caspian red deer and brown bear.

In the coastal waters belonging to the national park, stellate sturgeon, brown trout, eel, pikeperch and Caspian kutum can be found.

See also
 Nature of Azerbaijan
 National Parks of Azerbaijan
 State Reserves of Azerbaijan
 List of protected areas of Azerbaijan

References

External links
 Samur-Yalama National Park Official Website - Ministry of Ecology and Natural Resources of Azerbaijan 

IUCN Category II
National parks of Azerbaijan
Forests of Azerbaijan
Protected areas established in 2012
2012 establishments in Azerbaijan
Khachmaz District